Malikia spinosa is a Gram-negative soil bacterium.

References

External links
Type strain of Malikia spinosa at BacDive -  the Bacterial Diversity Metadatabase

Comamonadaceae